is a Japanese former professional baseball pitcher 
in Japan's Nippon Professional Baseball. He played with the Fukuoka SoftBank Hawks from 2008 to 2014.

On 1 October 2016, Oba was released by the Chunichi Dragons only one year after signing via a cash deal with the Hawks.

External links

NPB stats

References

1985 births
Chunichi Dragons players
Fukuoka SoftBank Hawks players
Japanese expatriate baseball players in Puerto Rico
Living people
Nippon Professional Baseball pitchers
People from Adachi, Tokyo
Toyo University alumni
Criollos de Caguas players